Francis Ashbery Sampson (February 6, 1842 – February 4, 1918) was an American lawyer and historian.

Life

Sampson was born in 1842 in Harrison County, Ohio to Francis Sampson and Margaret Evans. He attended school in New York, graduating from the City College of New York and the Law School of the City University of New York. After receiving his law degree he settled in Sedalia, Missouri, where he established a law practice and became involved in local civic and business affairs.

Legacy

In 1901, Sampson was appointed secretary of the State Historical Society of Missouri, donating at the same time his sizable personal library. He was active in the development of the Society, co-founding the Mississippi Valley Historical Association and serving as its first president.

Death

He died in 1918 in Columbia, Missouri.

References

City College of New York alumni
City University of New York alumni
American historians
People from Sedalia, Missouri
1842 births
1918 deaths